The FIBA Asia Champions Cup, previously known as the Asian Basketball Confederation (ABC) Champions Cup until 2002, is the Asian club championship for professional basketball. It is organised by FIBA Asia, and takes place once a year (since 1995).

FIBA has in the past announced plans to expand the FIBA Intercontinental Cup to possibly include the champion teams from the FIBA Asia Champions Cup, Basketball Africa League (BAL), NBL from Australia, and possibly the NBA, at some point in the future.

From 2020 to 2022, the league was cancelled three seasons in a row due to the COVID-19 pandemic.

Summary

Titles by club

Titles by country

References 
General
 Official website of FIBA Asia

Specific

 
International club basketball competitions
Basketball club competitions in Asia
Multi-national professional sports leagues